The West African seedeater (Crithagra canicapilla) is a small passerine bird in the finch family. It is found in Guinea, Sierra Leone, southern Mali and northern Ivory Coast across to southern Niger and northern Cameroon.

Some authorities have considered the West African seedeater as a subspecies of the streaky-headed seedeater (Crithagra gularis).

Three subspecies are recognised:
 C. c. canicapilla (Du Bus de Gisignies, 1855)
 C. c. elgonensis (Ogilvie-Grant, 1912)
 C. c. montanorum (Bannerman, 1923)

References

West African seedeater
Birds of West Africa
West African seedeater
West African seedeater